Diplocheilichthys pleurotaenia is a species of cyprinid in the genus Diplocheilichthys. It inhabits Borneo, Sumatra and Java.

References

Cyprinidae
Fish of Indonesia
Cyprinid fish of Asia